The 2007 National Invitation Tournament was a single-elimination tournament of 32 National Collegiate Athletic Association (NCAA) Division I teams which did not participate in the 2007 NCAA Division I men's basketball tournament.  The West Virginia University Mountaineers won the 2007 NIT.

The participating teams were selected by the National Invitation Tournament (NIT) selection committee using numerous resources such as computer rankings, results (head-to-head, chronological, last 10 games played, non-conference), and polls.  The first round, second round, and quarterfinal games are held at the home court of the higher seed. The semifinal and final round are played at Madison Square Garden in New York City, New York. The 32 participating teams were announced on March 11, 2007. This is the first time since the NIT began seeding that all of the #1 seeds made the Final Four.  Not only that, but both of the semifinal matches between the #1 seeds were one point games.

Selected teams

Automatic qualifiers
The following teams were automatic qualifiers for the 2007 NIT field after losing in their respective conference tournaments; by virtue of winning their conferences' regular season championship and not qualifying for the NCAA tournament.

Thirty-two NCAA Division I teams participated in the 2007 NIT, reduced from the prior years' 40. Teams are chosen by the NIT selection committee based on numerous resources, including "computer rankings, head-to-head results, chronological results, Division I results, non-conference results, home and away results, results in the last 10 games, polls and the coaches' regional advisory committee's rankings".  The teams are then seeded according to the NIT's procedures for seeding teams.  The teams are then placed into four regions: East, South, West, and North.

First round

The first round took place on March 13, 2007, and March 14, 2007.  The higher-seeded team hosted each game.

Second round

The second round took place March 15, 2007, through March 19, 2007.  The higher-seeded team hosted the game.

*Under normal circumstances, the RBC Center would be used as NC State's home court, but a concert was scheduled that night at that facility, forcing the Wolfpack to use their older arena (still regularly in use for women's basketball), Reynolds Coliseum.

**A new attendance record for a NIT game was set at the Syracuse–San Diego State game in the Carrier Dome. Syracuse won the game 80–64 with the attendance total of 26,752.The old record of 23,522 was set by Kentucky in 1979.

Quarterfinals

The quarterfinals round took place March 20, 2007, and March 21, 2007. (March 22 was reserved as a backup date in case of scheduling conflicts, but none arose.) The higher-seeded team hosted each game.

Semifinals

The semifinals round took place March 27, 2007 at Madison Square Garden.

Finals

The finals round took place March 29, 2007 at Madison Square Garden.

The post-tournament celebration by the Mountaineers was overshadowed by a typographical error on the championship T-shirt, on which the school name was rendered as WEST VIRGINA. The vendor, 6th Man Sportswear, apologized for this mistake, and corrected the spelling for all T-shirts except those 25 printed for the team in preparation for a victory.

Bracket

East Region

South Region

West Region

North Region

Semifinals and Finals

See also
 2007 Women's National Invitation Tournament
 2007 NCAA Division I men's basketball tournament
 2007 NCAA Division II men's basketball tournament
 2007 NCAA Division III men's basketball tournament
 2007 NCAA Division I women's basketball tournament
 2007 NCAA Division II women's basketball tournament
 2007 NCAA Division III women's basketball tournament
 2007 NAIA Division I men's basketball tournament
 2007 NAIA Division II men's basketball tournament
 2007 NAIA Division I women's basketball tournament
 2007 NAIA Division II women's basketball tournament

References

National Invitation
National Invitation Tournament
2000s in Manhattan
Basketball in New York City
College sports in New York City
Madison Square Garden
National Invitation Tournament
National Invitation Tournament
Sports competitions in New York City
Sports in Manhattan